Krebsbach (in its upper course: Hungergraben) is a river which flows through the South Western state of Germany, Baden-Württemberg, Germany. It flows into the Würm in Ehningen.

See also
List of rivers of Baden-Württemberg

References

Rivers of Baden-Württemberg
Schönbuch
Rivers of Germany